Roman Valent was the defending champion, but did not complete in the Juniors this year.

Todd Reid defeated Lamine Ouahab in the final, 7–6(7-5), 6–4 to win the boys' singles tennis title at the 2002 Wimbledon Championships.

Seeds

  Wang Yeu-tzuoo (first round)
  Brian Dabul (first round)
  Clément Morel (second round)
  Marcos Baghdatis (second round)
  Todd Reid (champion)
  Marcel Felder (second round)
  Lamine Ouahab (final)
  Philipp Petzschner (quarterfinals)
  Alex Bogdanovic (second round)
  Martín Vilarrubí (first round)
  Steve Darcis (semifinals)
  Brian Baker (first round)
  Mathieu Montcourt (quarterfinals)
  Dudi Sela (first round)
  Tomáš Berdych (second round)
  Jo-Wilfried Tsonga (third round)

Draw

Finals

Top half

Section 1

Section 2

Bottom half

Section 3

Section 4

References

External links

Boys' Singles
Wimbledon Championship by year – Boys' singles